Coptotermes emersoni, is a species of subterranean termite of the genus Coptotermes. It is native to India, Sri Lanka, and Vietnam. Though it is a wood destroying termite, it was first found from an electrical wire case in the National Museum of Colombo.

References

External links
Current Status of Coptotermes Wasmann
http://www.bulletinofinsectology.org/pdfarticles/vol67-2014-131-136nguyen.pdf Identification of Vietnamese Coptotermes pest species
based on the sequencing of two regions of 16S rRNA gene

Termites
Insects described in 1953
Insects of Vietnam